Blue Wave or Bluewave may also refer to:

Music
Blue Wave, a 1998 album by THC
"Blue Wave", a 1984 song by Eddy Grant from Going for Broke
"Blue Wave", a 2007 song by West Indian Girl from 4th & Wall
Blue Wave, the marching band of Gordon Central High School in Georgia, U.S.

Sports
Orix BlueWave, a former Nippon Professional Baseball team, Japan
Chonburi Bluewave Futsal Club, a Thai Futsal League team
Blue Wave, a nickname for the Al Hilal Club, Sudan
Blue Wave, a nickname for the teams of Darien High School, U.S.
Blue Wave, a nickname for Florida Atlantic Owls baseball, U.S.
Blue Wave, a nickname for the Surfers Paradise Baseball Club, Australia
Blue Wave, a nickname for the teams of Westsyde Secondary School, Canada

Other uses
Wave elections in the United States, a blue wave is when the Democratic Party makes significant gains
2018 blue wave, a description of the United States Democratic Party success in the 2018 midterm elections
Conservative wave, also called blue tide, the success of right-wing presidential candidates in South America since 2015
Blue Wave (mail reader), a 1990s file-based offline mail reader
Blue Wave-Marikina, mall and office complex in Marikina, Metro Manila, Philippines
Myscelia cyaniris or blue wave, a species of butterfly
Blue Wave updates, a series of firmware updates for the Samsung P2

See also
Great Wave (disambiguation)
Wave (disambiguation)
The Wave (disambiguation)
The Great Wave off Kanagawa